The Redya is a river in Kholmsky, Poddorsky, Starorussky, and Parfinsky Districts of Novgorod Oblast in Russia. It is a left tributary of the Lovat.

The source of the Redya is in Lake Rdeyskoye in Kholmsky District. The upper course of the river, including Lake Rdeyskoye, is located within Rdeysky Nature Reserve, which is a vast swampy unpopulated area. The Redya flows northeast. Onle several initial kilometers of its course are located in Kholmsky District, after which the Redya crosses over to Poddorsky District. The district administrative center, the selo of Poddorye, is located on the left bank of the Redya. Downstream of Poddorye, the Redya crosses into Starorussky District. In this area, the Redya is one of many sizeable rivers flowing northeast over the Ilmen Depression, towards Lake Ilmen. The course of the Redya is confined between the courses of the Lovat (east) and the Porusya (west). For approximately  the Redya forms the boundary between Starorussky and Parfinsky Districts. In the lower course it departs from the boundary back into Starorussky District and joins the Lovat, forming a joint delta with the Lovat, the Pola, and the Polist.

References

Rivers of Novgorod Oblast